Dorota Dziekiewicz-Pilich  (born 25 June 1969 in Szczecinek, Poland) is a Polish sculptor and drawing artist.

Education
She passed the matura exam in Liceum im. Księżnej Elżbiety (Lyceum of Princess Elizabeth) in Szczecinek and later Academy of Fine Arts in Poznań. She learned sculpturing from Professor Józef Petruk and Professor Józef Kopczyński. She graduated in 1993.

Style and type of sculptures

Dziekiewicz-Pilich creates sculptures mainly made of bronze with the lost-wax casting technique. Her favourite types of sculptures are portrait and grotesque. She also makes small forms like: statuettes, medals, commemorative plaques, jewellery and other items.

An important place in Dorota Dziekiewicz-Pilich creations take children topics. She made many sculptures, which in realistic or grotesque ways portray children, their play, dance, dalliance and mischief.

Dziekiewicz-Pilich also creates large sculpturing works like statues: concept and project of the statue commemorating a visit of John Paul II in Piłsudski square, Warsaw (2005), concept of fontain titled "Mali muzykanci z Pruszkowa" (Little musicians from Pruszków) (2009) and the statue of Adam Giedrys in Szczecinek (2009).

Awards and achievements

In 1993, she was awarded the first prize for the statuette of Bytów town.

In 1996 she won the competition for a concept of the Polish annual music award – the Fryderyk statuette. In 1998, she presented an exhibition titled "Twarze Fryderyków" (Faces of the Fryderyks) held in Galeria Zapiecek. The exhibition presented personalised Fryderyk statuettes and small sculptures of the awarded: Stanisław Sojka, Grzegorz Ciechowski, Grzegorz Turnau, Kayah and Justyna Steczkowska.

In 1997, then Warsaw Mayor Marcin Święcicki chose her work "Mała skrzypaczka" (Little violinist) as an award for the best Polish violinist in the International Tadeusz Wroński Solo Violin Competition.

In 2006 she received third prize in a competition run by the Warsaw Mayor for a concept commemorating the visit of John Paul II.

In 2009 she won the contest for the statue of Adam Giedrys in Szczecinek.

Works
She presented her sculptures and drawing a few dozen of times in individual and group exhibitions in Poland and Europe. Her bronze works are held in private collections in many countries including Germany, Holland, France and Malta.

Exhibitions
 1994 – individual, Art Galeria, Szczecinek
 1995 – individual, Galeria P., Pruszków
 1995 – individual, Radziejowice Palace
 1996 – individual, Galeria "Zamek", Ostróda
 1996 – group, "Rzeźba w przestrzeni publicznej i prywatnej" (Sculpture in public and private space), Galeria Domu Artysty Plastyka, Warsaw
 1997 – individual, "Fryderyk, muzyka, przestrzeń" (Fryderyk, music, space), Galeria Zapiecek, Warsaw
 1997 – individual, Wystawa Jednego Wieczoru "Fryderyk, muzyka, przestrzeń" (Single Evening Exhibition "Fryderyk, music, space"), foyer of Sala Kongresowa, Warsaw
 1998 – individual, "Twarze Fryderyków" (Faces of Fryderyks), Galeria Zapiecek, Warsaw
 1998 – individual, Wystawa Jednego Wieczoru "Twarze Fryderyków" (Single Evening Exhibition "Faces of Fryderyks"), foyer of Sala Kongresowa, Warsaw
 1998 – group, "Bliźniemu swemu..." (To your neighbour...), exhibition and auction for Towarzystwo Pomocy im. św. Brata Alberta, Teatr Miejski im. Wandy Siemaszkowej, Rzeszów
 1998 – group, "Bliscy i Oddaleni" (Those near and far away), Art Galeria, Szczecinek w Szczecinku and Bergen op Zoom (Holland)
 1999–2000 – group, "Bliźniemu swemu... 2000" (To your neighbour... 2000), Galeria STUDIO, Pałac Kultury i Nauki (Warsaw), Muzeum Historyczne Miasta Gdańska, Muzeum Archidiecezjalne (Wrocław), Galeria Sztuki Artemis (Kraków), Teatr im. Wandy Siemaszkowej (Rzeszów)
 2001 – individual, "Dziecko" (Child), Bergen op Zoom (Holland) and Galeria Zapiecek (Warsaw)
 2001–2002 – group, "Bliźniemu swemu... 2002" (To your neighbour... 2002), Zachęta Narodowa Galeria Sztuki (Warsaw), Galeria Miejska Arsenał (Poznań), Muzeum Archidiecezjalne (Wrocław), Pałac Sztuki (Kraków), Muzeum Sztuki (Łódź), Teatr im. Wandy Siemaszkowej (Rzeszów)
 2002 – group, 30th Jubilee of Galeria Zapiecek, Warsaw
 2003 – individual, Pałac Sztuki, Kraków
 2003 – individual, during Witold Hulewicz award ceremony, Dom Literatury, Warsaw
 2005–2006 – several group exhibitions – "Sztuka w 18 aktach" (Play in 18 acts), "Tutaj malowane" (Painted here), "Dialog ze sztuką" (Dialogue with art) organised by Galeria Tess, Pruszków
 2009 – individual, Galeria Zapiecek, Warsaw

Significant artistic achievements and works
 1996 – Fryderyk statuette
 1997 – "Mała skrzypaczka" (Little violinist) used as a first prize the International Tadeusz Wroński Solo Violin Competition
 2000 – plaque commemorating Gen. Kazimierz Sosnkowski, Katedra Polowa Wojska Polskiego, Warsaw
 2002 – statuette promoting the national action "Cała Polska czyta dzieciom" (All of Poland reads to kids)
 2005 – special prize for statue/concept commemorating the visit of John Paul II, Warsaw
 2006 – medal for Fundacja Urszuli Jaworskiej Dawców Szpiku
 2007 – statuette for the award of Stowarzyszenie Filmowców Polskich for extraordinary artistic achievements
 2008 – medal awarded on Światowy Dzień Chorego (World Day of the Sick)
 2009 – statue of Adam Giedrys, Szczecinek

Other works
 statuette for the Astrid Lindgren contest for best Polish book for children
 statuette for bank "Bank Gospodarki Żywnościowej"
 statuette for foundation "Fundacja Warty i Kredyt Banku"
 medal for Pruszków city council
 statuette for Otwock city council
 statuette and medal for Polish branch of the financial firm Deloitte & Touche
 statuette for Polish branch of Panasonic
 statuette for action "Gryf Swoim Dzieciom"

References

External links 
 Official website of Dorota Dziekiewicz-Pilich

1969 births
Living people
20th-century Polish sculptors
20th-century Polish women artists
21st-century Polish women artists
21st-century Polish sculptors
People from Szczecinek
Polish women sculptors